(aka. Tricolo) is a Japanese manga written and illustrated by Hai Ran. The manga was serialised in Hobunsha's Manga Time Kirara until 2005, when it was discontinued. Media Works's Dengeki Daioh started to serialised the manga in June 2006. The manga is published in Japan by Hobunsha and is licensed in North America by DrMaster.

Reception
Anime News Network's Carlo Santos commends the manga for its "simple, pleasing art and easily identifiable character" but criticises it for making a futile attempt at "being funny".

References

External links

ASCII Media Works manga
Kadokawa Dwango franchises
Comedy anime and manga
Dengeki Daioh
Shōnen manga
Seinen manga